The Sailplane Grand Prix St. Moritz was the second qualifying Gliding Grand Prix for the FAI World Grand Prix 2010-2011.

External links
 https://web.archive.org/web/20100529223816/http://www.fai.org/gliding/QSGP2010_2011

Gliding competitions